Agustín Viana (born 23 August 1983 in Chicago) is an American-born Uruguayan former professional footballer.

Career
Viana began his career with  Uruguayan side Bella Vista. He remained at the club for four years before drawing the attention of Uruguayan power Nacional Montevideo. He then joined Nacional and helped the club in capturing the 2005–06 Uruguayan Primera División title. With Nacional he made 35 league appearances and scored one goal. Viana joined Atlético Mineiro in January 2008 on loan from Nacional. Viana played for the club in the 2008 Copa do Brasil and Campeonato Mineiro. After one year in Brazil Viana returned to his first club Bella Vista.

In January 2009, Viana transferred to CFR Cluj. However, he did not feature regularly for the Romanian club. After a brief stay in Romania Viana signed with Italian club Gallipoli and quickly established himself as a starter. The following season, he returned to Bella Vista and was one of Uruguays top defenders. In July 2010 Nacional made public his desire of reacquiring Viana.
However, he signed with Greek club Levadiakos and appeared in 13 league matches for the club. In 2012, he returned to Bella Vista and started all of the club's 15 matches in the Apertura and scored 2 goals.

On 28 January 2013 he signed with the Columbus Crew. Viana was released on 18 November 2014 after two season with The Crew.

International career
Viana was part of Uruguay's youth team set ups, including the U20 squad that competed in the 2003 South American U-20 Championship held in his native Uruguay.

Honours
Nacional Montevideo
Primera División: 2005–06

References

External links
 
 
 
 
 
 

1983 births
Living people
Uruguayan footballers
Uruguay under-20 international footballers
Uruguayan expatriate footballers
C.A. Bella Vista players
Club Nacional de Football players
Clube Atlético Mineiro players
CFR Cluj players
A.S.D. Gallipoli Football 1909 players
Levadiakos F.C. players
Columbus Crew players
Danubio F.C. players
Uruguayan Primera División players
Serie B players
Super League Greece players
Major League Soccer players
Expatriate footballers in Brazil
Expatriate footballers in Romania
Expatriate footballers in Greece
American people of Uruguayan descent
Sportspeople of Uruguayan descent
Soccer players from Chicago
Association football defenders